Jorge Brown (born 14 November 1929) was an Argentine sailor. He competed in the Star event at the 1956 Summer Olympics.

References

External links
 

1929 births
Possibly living people
Argentine male sailors (sport)
Olympic sailors of Argentina
Sailors at the 1956 Summer Olympics – Star
Place of birth missing (living people)